The 30 June Stadium is a stadium used mostly for football matches and also sometimes for athletics located in Cairo. It was built by the Egyptian Air Defense Forces. The stadium is the main venue of the Air Defense Sport Village. The stadium has a capacity of 30,000 and it is one of the venues of the Egyptian Premier League. It is the  home ground of the Egyptian Premier League side Pyramids F.C.

In March 2019 it was announced that the stadium will host all bar one of the fixtures of Group C in the 2019 Africa Cup of Nations, as well as one Group A and Group D match and one match each in the round of 16, the quarter finals, and the semi-finals.

Accidents

Twenty-eight football fans died on 8 February 2015 in a confrontation with the police at the gates of Egyptian stadium during a league match between two Cairo clubs, Zamalek SC and ENPPI. Most of the dead were crushed to death and suffocated when the crowd stampeded after police used tear gas to clear the fans trying to force their way into the stadium. Egypt's hardcore fans are notorious for violent behavior at matches, and Egypt has designated some as terrorist groups.

2019 Africa Cup of Nations
The stadium is one of the venues for the 2019  Africa Cup of Nations.

The following games were played at the stadium during the 2019  Africa Cup of Nations:

References

Stadiums in Cairo
Football venues in Egypt
Football in Cairo
2019 Africa Cup of Nations stadiums